Raymond Henry Sherry (3 October 1924 – 13 June 1989) was an Australian politician. Born in Sydney, he was educated there at state schools. He spent 1941 to 1946 with the merchant navy before becoming an actor, television broadcaster and commentator, moving to Hobart in 1956. In 1969, he was elected to the Australian House of Representatives as the Labor member for Franklin, defeating Liberal MP Thomas Pearsall. He held the seat until his defeat by Liberal candidate Bruce Goodluck in 1975. In 1976 he entered the Tasmanian House of Assembly for Franklin, holding the seat until 1979. Sherry died in 1989. His son, Nick Sherry, was a Senator from Tasmania from 1990 to 2012.

References

1924 births
1989 deaths
Australian Labor Party members of the Parliament of Australia
Members of the Australian House of Representatives for Franklin
Members of the Australian House of Representatives
Members of the Tasmanian House of Assembly
20th-century Australian politicians